Abraxas is the second studio album by Latin rock band Santana. It was released on September 23, 1970 by Columbia Records and became the band's first album to reach number one in the United States.

Title
The title of the album originates from a line in Hermann Hesse's book Demian, quoted on the album's back cover: "We stood before it and began to freeze inside from the exertion. We questioned the painting, berated it, made love to it, prayed to it: We called it mother, called it whore and slut, called it our beloved, called it Abraxas...."

Songs
Carlos Santana had been interested in Fleetwood Mac's leader and songwriter Peter Green, having seen him perform at the Fillmore West in San Francisco, and decided to cover the band's song "Black Magic Woman". Both were influenced as guitarists by B.B. King. The band added a cover of Gabor Szabo's instrumental "Gypsy Queen" to the end. "Oye Como Va" was a hit by Tito Puente in the early 1960s and the group played it live regularly, as they realized it was good for audiences to dance to.

"Incident at Neshabur" was co-written by Santana and his friend Alberto Gianquinto, who played piano on the track. Gregg Rolie played the other keyboards, contrasting with Gianquinto's jazz-influenced style. It ran through various time and key signatures.

The instrumental, "Samba Pa Ti" ("Samba for You"), was written by Santana after he saw a jazz saxophonist performing in the street outside his apartment. It was later covered by José Feliciano, who added lyrics, and also by Angélique Kidjo, who put lyrics in Yoruba, on her album Oyo. It is also one of the tracks featured in Nick Hornby's book 31 Songs.

Cover art
The album cover features the 1961 painting Annunciation by German-French painter Mati Klarwein. According to the artist, it was one of the first paintings he did after relocating to New York City. Carlos Santana reportedly noticed it in a magazine and asked that it be on the cover of the band's upcoming album. On the back of the record sleeve the cover art is just credited to 'MATI'. It is now considered a classic of rock album covers. Klarwein went on to design album artwork for many notable artists, including Miles Davis, Herbie Hancock, Earth, Wind & Fire, and Gregg Allman.

Critical reception

In 2003 the album was ranked number 205 on Rolling Stone magazine's list of the 500 greatest albums of all time, 207 on the 2012 list, and then at number 334 in a 2020 edition of the list. In 2000 it was voted number 202 in Colin Larkin's All Time Top 1000 Albums. The album was also included in the book 1001 Albums You Must Hear Before You Die. In 2015, the album was listed among Billboards  50 Essential Latin Albums of the 50 Past Years.

Rock critic Robert Christgau, in one of his capsule reviews in The Village Voice, at the time of the album's release, gave it a rating of only C+, which denotes "a not disreputable performance, most likely a failed experiment or a pleasant piece of hackwork."

Legacy
Abraxas was deemed "culturally, historically, or artistically significant" by the Library of Congress and was selected for preservation in their National Recording Registry in 2015.

Track listing

Original release

1998 bonus tracks

Personnel

Santana
Carlos Santana – lead guitar, backing vocals, producer
Gregg Rolie – keyboards, lead vocals
David Brown – bass
Michael Shrieve – drums
José "Chepito" Areas – percussion, conga, timbales
Michael Carabello – percussion, conga, possible keyboards on "Singing Winds, Crying Beasts" (the latter disputed by Santana)

Additional personnel
Rico Reyes – backing vocal on "Oye Como Va", backing vocal and percussion on "El Nicoya"
Alberto Gianquinto – piano on "Incident at Neshabur"
Fred Catero - Producer
John Fiore, David Brown – engineer
Bob Venosa – graphics
MATI – illustrations
Marian Schmidt, Joan Chase - photography

Release history
In 1990, CBS/Sony published a remastered edition on Audio CD (Universal Product Code: 7464301302 ).
In 1991, Mobile Fidelity Sound Lab released a remastered version on their Ultradisc (24K) Gold CD (UDCD 552).
In 1997, ARS (Audiophile record service Joerg Kessler) of Germany, released a 180 gram 100% virgin vinyl pressing mastered from the original analog tape. It is (Pallas) Germany pressed. Catalog # Ars 32032.
In 1998, Sony published a remastered version, which included three previously unreleased live tracks: "Se a Cabó", "Toussaint L'Overture" and "Black Magic Woman/Gypsy Queen," recorded at the Royal Albert Hall on April 18, 1970.
In 1998, SME records in Japan, part of Sony Music, also released the remastered version as an SACD. This disc is stereo only, and furthermore, it is a single layer SACD, which means that ordinary CD players will not play it. This disc contains the same bonus tracks as the ordinary 1998 remastered CD.
In 2008, Mobile Fidelity Sound Lab released a remastered version on their Ultradisc II (24K) Gold CD (UDCD 775) & GAIN 2™ Ultra Analog LP 180g Series (MFSL305).
In 2016 Mobile Fidelity Sound Lab released a new, limited edition, 45 rpm 2-LP box set of Abraxas called the 1 step (UD1S). The set was limited to 2500 copies worldwide and involved a process where several of the traditional steps in making a vinyl record were bypassed in order to get a more original sound. It is mastered using a 1/4" / 15 IPS analog master to DSD 256 to analog console to lathe.

Charts

Certifications

See also
 List of best-selling Latin albums

References
Citations

Sources

 

Santana (band) albums
1970 albums
CBS Records albums
Columbia Records albums
Grammy Hall of Fame Award recipients
Albums produced by Carlos Santana
Jazz fusion albums by American artists
Jazz fusion albums by Mexican artists
Spanish-language albums
Albums produced by Fred Catero
Albums recorded at Wally Heider Studios
Albums with cover art by Mati Klarwein
United States National Recording Registry recordings
United States National Recording Registry albums